Arvid, Arved, Arnvid or Arvydas is a male given name, most common in Scandinavia but also in Iran and Lithuania. In Scandinavia it is derived from Old Norse  and means "forest of eagles" or 'eagle wood'. Arvid is a royal male name that is composed of words with the meanings "king" and "legend". In Old Persian, Arvid is derived from  +  means "Aryan knowledge".

People named Arvid include:
 Arvid Andersson (disambiguation), various Olympic Games competitors
 Arvid Carlsson (1923–2018), Swedish scientist and Nobel laureate
 Arvid Hanssen (1932–1998), Norwegian journalist, newspaper editor, poet, novelist and children's writer
 Arvid Harnack (1901–1942), German jurist, economist, and resistance fighter in Nazi Germany
 Arvid Horn (1664–1742), Swedish soldier, diplomat and politician
 Arvid Järnefelt (1861–1932), Finnish writer
 Arvid Johanson (1929–2013), Norwegian newspaper editor and politician
 Arvid Knutsen (1944–2009), Norwegian footballer and coach
 Arvid Lindman (1862–1936), Swedish rear admiral, industrialist and politician
 Arvid Lundberg (born 1994), Swedish ice hockey defenceman
 Arvid Nyholm (1866–1927), Swedish-American painter
 Arvid Pardo (1914–1999), Maltese diplomat, scholar and university professor
 Arvid Posse (1820–1901), Prime Minister of Sweden from 1880 to 1883
 Arvid Stålarm the Younger (c. 1540 or 1549–1620), Swedish noble and soldier
 Arvid Storsveen (1915–1943), Norwegian organizer of XU, the main intelligence gathering organisation in occupied Norway during World War II
 Arvid Taube (1853–1916), Swedish aristocrat, diplomat and politician.
 Arvid Trolle (c. 1440–1505), Swedish magnate and politician
 Arvid Wittenberg (1606–1657), Swedish count, field marshal and privy
 Arvīds Pelše (1899–1983), Soviet Latvian politician and government functionary
 Arvydas Sabonis (born 1964), President of Lithuanian basketball federation. Former famous basketball player, NBA hall of fame
 PewDiePie (born 1989 as Felix Arvid Ulf Kjellberg), Swedish YouTuber

See also

References 

Scandinavian masculine given names
Norwegian masculine given names
Swedish masculine given names
Estonian masculine given names